"Mi Persona Favorita" (English: "My Favorite Person") is a song by Spanish singer Alejandro Sanz and Cuban-American singer Camila Cabello, from Sanz's twelfth studio album El Disco (2019). The song was released by Universal Music Spain on March 28, 2019 as the album's third single accompanied by its music video, which first premiered on Sanz's official Vevo channel and directed by American director Gil Green.

The composition and lyrics of the song were written by Sanz and Cabello. The track was produced by the former and music producers Alfonso Pérez and Julio Reyes Copello. The City of Prague Philharmonic Orchestra played orchestra for the song, which was conducted by Czech conductor Adam Klemens, who also played the piano for the song. Spanish flamenco guitarist José Miguel Carmona, lead guitarist from Spanish new flamenco musical group Ketama, played the flamenco guitar. Twice Grammy Award-winning American drummer Larnell Lewis played drums for the song. The song topped the charts in Costa Rica, El Salvador, Guatemala, Nicaragua and Panama. It was the Record of the Year and Best Pop Song on 20th Annual Latin Grammy Awards. It was also nominated for Latin Grammy Award for Song of the Year.

Background
Cabello revealed how the collaboration was born, stating that Sanz invited her to Miami in summer 2018 to record the song and film the music video together:

She continued, adding that she dedicated the song to her little sister, Sofi, who she considers her "favorite person."

Composition and lyrics
"Mi Persona Favorita" is a flamenco pop ballad, featuring Spanish flamenco guitarist José Miguel Carmona, lead guitarist from Spanish new flamenco musical group Ketama playing the flamenco guitar in the song. As Jeff Benjamin of Forbes opined, musically, it delivers the kind of quality duet longtime Sanz fans love for the singer and his penchant for flamenco inspired music style, and layers the two singers' distinct vocal timbres—both raspy with the slightest bit of native twang—into a soothing, snappy acoustic cut. Lyrically, it's easy enough for any of the performers' young fans to sing along with—regardless of their native language.

Commercial performance
The song debuted at 22 on Spanish official single chart on 8 March 2019 and reached number-four on Billboard Spain Digital Song Sales chart on 11 May 2019. This song later reached number-one on Spanish official airplay chart. The song is certified as Platinum for selling over 40,000 digital copies in Spain in May 2019, and certified as Gold (Latin) in the United States and Puerto Rico by RIAA on 31 July 2019.

Internationally, the song became a great success in Central America, reaching number one in Costa Rica, Guatemala, El Salvador, Nicaragua and Panama. In Europe, the song reached number-six on Billboard Euro Digital Song Sales chart on 29 May 2019.

Music videos
The official music video of the song was released on 28 March 2019. It's directed by American director Gil Green, who formerly collaborated with Cabello on the video of "Hey Ma". The video shows both Sanz and Cabello singing and vibing together at the recording studio, but the larger story is the couples featured throughout the visual. Couples pose in front of a white backdrop. The visual begins and ends with pairs expressing what they love most about their partners.

In the video, a diverse group of lovers—ranging in their skin colors, sexualities, ages, body sizes and more—differing from English, Spanish to Portuguese speakers, and all displaying their different means of affection. It once again embraces a larger, more universal message that can help this song reach more people. Also, the positive portrayal of two different gay couples is a much-appreciated co-sign.

A vertical video was released on 29 March 2019 on Spotify and Apple Music.

Accolades

Track listings

Credits and personnel
Credits adapted from Tidal.

Personnel
 Alejandro Sanz – vocals, lyrics, composition, co-production, recording arrangement
 Camila Cabello – vocals, lyrics, composition
 The City of Prague Philharmonic Orchestra – orchestra
 Adam Klemens – conducting, piano
 José Miguel Carmona – flamenco guitar
 Larnell Lewis – drums
 Alfonso Pérez – production, keyboards, programming, recording arrangement, recording engineering, string arrangement, studio personnel
 Julio Reyes Copello – production, keyboards, recording arrangement, recording engineering, string arrangement, studio personnel
 Natalia Ramírez – vocal production, associate performing
 Gene Grimaldi – mastering engineering, studio personnel
 Trevor Lyle Muzzy – mix engineering, studio personnel
 Nicolas De La Espriella – programming
 Carlos Fernando Lopez – recording engineering, studio personnel
 Jan Holzner – recording engineering, studio personnel
 Nicolás Ramírez – recording engineering, studio personnel

Charts

Weekly charts

Year-end charts

Certifications

Release history

See also
 List of number-one singles of 2019 (Spain)

References

Alejandro Sanz songs
Camila Cabello songs
2019 songs
2019 singles
Songs written by Alejandro Sanz
Songs written by Camila Cabello
Spanish-language songs
Latin Grammy Award for Record of the Year
Latin Grammy Award for Best Pop Song
Song recordings produced by Julio Reyes Copello